The Anatomy of Addiction is the second and final studio album by the experimental rock band God, released on 5 May 1994 by Big Cat Records.

Reception
Allmusic staff writer Ned Raggett gave the record three stars, calling it a "fantastic listen" and "a good way for the band to go".

Accolades

Track listing

Personnel
Adapted from The Anatomy of Addiction liner notes.

God
Justin Broadrick – guitar
Lou Ciccotelli – drums, percussion
Dave Cochrane – bass guitar
John Edwards – double bass
Tim Hodgkinson – saxophone
Gary Jeff – bass guitar
Scott Kiehl – percussion
Kevin Martin – vocals, saxophone, sampler, production
Russell Smith – guitar

Additional musicians and production
Alex Buess – clarinet, mixing
Tony Cousins – mastering
The Pathological Puppy – front cover design
Tom Prentice – viola
The RGB Design – layout
Jon Wakelin – engineering

Release history

References

External links 
 

1994 albums
God (British band) albums
Big Cat Records albums